Wehra is a river of Baden-Württemberg, Germany. It passes through Todtmoos and Wehr and flows into the Rhine downstream of Bad Säckingen.

See also
List of rivers of Baden-Württemberg

References

Rivers of Baden-Württemberg
Rivers of Germany